The team tennis competition at the 2006 Asian Games was arranged in a 16-team knockout bracket. Each tie consisted of two singles and one doubles match.

South Korea won the men's competition after beating Japan in the final. Thailand and Chinese Taipei both finished third and won bronze medal.

Schedule
All times are Arabia Standard Time (UTC+03:00)

Results

Round of 16

Quarterfinals

Semifinals

Final

Non-participating athletes

References

External links 
Men's draw

Tennis at the 2006 Asian Games